Plélauff is a commune in the Côtes-d'Armor department of Brittany in northwestern France.

Toponym
Like for other cities like Guiscriff, Plogoff or the surnames Le Hénaff, Heussaff or Gourcuff, the digraph -ff was introduced by Middle Ages' authors to indicate a nasalized vowel.

Population

Inhabitants of Plélauff are called plélauffiens in French.

Map

See also
Communes of the Côtes-d'Armor department

References

External links

Communes of Côtes-d'Armor